Stuart Els (born 1 February 2001) is a South African cricketer. He made his first-class debut on 30 January 2020, for Border in the 2019–20 CSA 3-Day Provincial Cup. He made his List A debut on 16 February 2020, for Border in the 2019–20 CSA Provincial One-Day Challenge.

References

External links
 

2001 births
Living people
South African cricketers
Border cricketers
Place of birth missing (living people)